The canton of Gourin is an administrative division of the Morbihan department, northwestern France. Its borders were modified at the French canton reorganisation which came into effect in March 2015. Its seat is in Gourin.

It consists of the following communes:
 
Berné
Cléguérec
Le Croisty
Le Faouët
Gourin
Guémené-sur-Scorff
Guiscriff
Kergrist
Kernascléden
Langoëlan
Langonnet
Lanvénégen
Lignol
Locmalo
Malguénac
Meslan
Neulliac
Persquen
Ploërdut
Plouray
Priziac
Roudouallec
Le Saint
Saint-Aignan
Saint-Caradec-Trégomel
Sainte-Brigitte
Saint-Tugdual
Séglien
Silfiac

References

Cantons of Morbihan